The Delaporte distribution is a discrete probability distribution that has received attention in actuarial science. It can be defined using the convolution of a negative binomial distribution with a Poisson distribution. The distribution is named for Pierre Delaporte, who analyzed it in relation to automobile accident claim counts in 1959, although it appeared in a different form as early as 1934 in a paper by Rolf von Lüders, where it was called the Formel II distribution.

Properties
The skewness of the Delaporte distribution is:

The excess kurtosis of the distribution is:

References

Further reading

External links

Discrete distributions
Compound probability distributions